Allsvenskan 2004, part of the 2004 Swedish football season, was the 80th Allsvenskan season played. The first match was played 3 April 2004 and the last match was played 30 October 2004. Malmö FF won the league ahead of runners-up Halmstads BK, while AIK and Trelleborgs FF were relegated.

Summary
Djurgårdens IF announced in early November 2003 that the club would move its home games to Råsunda Stadium from 2004.
The game Hammarby IF-Malmö FF (0–0) was played in front of 15 626 spectators at Söderstadion in Stockholm on Tuesday, 6 April 2004. Following the game, a group of Malmö FF supporters were given mass media publicity for using a banner where three deceased well-known Hammarby IF-personalities were mocked.
Following riots during the game Hammarby IF-AIK (1-1) on Monday, 18 October at Råsunda Stadium AIK was required to play the home game against Örgryte IS on 24 October 2004 at the same stadium without any spectators. AIK lost, 0-3, and were related from Allsvenskan. Sportbladet's Lasse Sandlin described the atmosphere at the empty stadium as the "Valley of the Shadow of Death".
On Friday 5 November, the competition committee of the Swedish Football Association met to discuss debates regarding too many non-EU players. Örgryte IS was stripped on one point from the game GIF Sundsvall–Örgryte IS, which was played on 18 April 2004 and originally ended in a 1–1 draw. The result was changed, instead giving the victory to GIF Sundsvall, 3–0. The decision was criticised for changing the table following the end of the season. Malmö FF was involved in a similar decision, but not stripped on any points.

Participating clubs

League table

Results

Relegation play-offs 

2–2 on aggregate. Örgryte IS won on away goals.

Season statistics

Top scorers

Attendances

References 

Print
 
 
 

Online

External links 
Allsvenskan 2004 – Svensk Fotboll

Notes 

Allsvenskan seasons
Swed
Swed
1